Mohammed Abdul-Sattar Jabouri (born 1961) is an Iraqi wrestler. He competed in the men's freestyle 82 kg at the 1988 Summer Olympics.

References

External links
 

1961 births
Living people
Iraqi male sport wrestlers
Olympic wrestlers of Iraq
Wrestlers at the 1988 Summer Olympics
Wrestlers at the 1986 Asian Games
Place of birth missing (living people)
Asian Games competitors for Iraq